The Simurq PFC 2010–11 season was Simurq's fifth Azerbaijan Premier League season, which they finished in 11th position. They were knocked out of the Azerbaijan Cup by Absheron at the Last 16 stage. It was their first, and only season with Gjoko Hadžievski as their manager.

Squad
As of 18 of May 2011.

Transfers

Summer

In:

Out:

Winter

In:

Out:

Competitions

Azerbaijan Premier League

First round

Results

League table

Relegation group

Results

Table

Azerbaijan Cup

Squad statistics

Appearances and goals

|-
|colspan="14"|Players who appeared for Simurq who left during the season:

|}

Goal scorers

Disciplinary record

References
Qarabağ have played their home games at the Tofiq Bahramov Stadium since 1993 due to the ongoing situation in Quzanlı.

External links 
 Official Website
 Simurq at Soccerway.com

Simurq PIK seasons
Simurq